The 1981 Minnesota Twins finished a combined 41–68, seventh in the American League West. In the strike split season, the Twins were 17–39, seventh place in the first half and 24–29, fourth place in the second half. 469,090 fans attended Twins games, the lowest total in the American League. It was also their 21st and final season at Metropolitan Stadium, before moving their home games to the Metrodome the next season. The franchise would not play another outdoor home game until 2010, when Target Field opened.

Offseason 
 December 8, 1980: Dave Edwards was traded by the Twins to the San Diego Padres for Chuck Baker.
 December 8, 1980: Jack O'Connor was drafted by the Twins from the Montreal Expos in the rule 5 draft.
 December 12, 1980: Willie Norwood was traded by the Twins to the Seattle Mariners for Byron McLaughlin.
 March 27, 1981: Bombo Rivera was released by the Twins.
 March 30, 1981: Ken Landreaux was traded by the Twins to the Los Angeles Dodgers for Mickey Hatcher, Kelly Snider (minors), and Matt Reeves (minors).

Regular season 

Only one Twins player made the All-Star Game: relief pitcher Doug Corbett.

On August 24, first baseman Kent Hrbek made his major league debut, in a Yankee Stadium game.  His twelfth-inning home run beat the Yankees 3-2.  Later that week, Hrbek was topped by catcher Tim Laudner, who debuted on August 28 and hit home runs in his first two games.

On September 20, Gary Gaetti made his major league debut and started at third base for the Twins.  In his first at bat in the second inning, he homered off Texas Rangers pitcher Charlie Hough to become the third Twin to homer in his first-ever at bat.  Gaetti joined Rick Renick (1968) and Dave McKay (1975).  Later, Andre David (1984) and Eddie Rosario (2015) will join the trio in Twins history.

The Twins played their final game at Metropolitan Stadium on September 30, losing 5-2 to the Kansas City Royals.  The club played their last outdoor home game for the next twenty-eight seasons in 56-degree temperature in front of 15,900 fans.  "The Met" had been the Twins' home since their Minnesota opener on April 21, 1961 (also a loss). Gary Ward had the final Twins hit in the Met, a single in the ninth inning.  Pete Mackanin homered in the second for the final Twins Met Stadium home run.

Offense 

John Castino batted .268 with 6 HR and 36 RBI. Shortstop Roy Smalley had 7 HR and collected 22 RBI.

Pitching 

Reliever Doug Corbett was the Twins' only bright spot on the mound, racking up 17 saves.

Season standings

Record vs. opponents

Notable transactions 
 June 8, 1981: Frank Viola was drafted by the Twins in the 2nd round of the 1981 Major League Baseball draft.
 August 23, 1981: Ron Jackson was traded by the Twins to the Detroit Tigers for a player to be named later. The Tigers completed the deal by sending Tim Corcoran to the Twins on September 4.
 August 30, 1981: Jerry Koosman was traded by the Twins to the Chicago White Sox for Ivan Mesa (minors), Ronnie Perry (minors), a player to be named later, and cash. The White Sox completed the trade by sending Randy Johnson to the Twins on September 2.

Roster

Player stats

Batting

Starters by position 
Note: Pos = Position; G = Games played; AB = At bats; H = Hits; Avg. = Batting average; HR = Home runs; RBI = Runs batted in

Other batters 
Note: G = Games played; AB = At bats; H = Hits; Avg. = Batting average; HR = Home runs; RBI = Runs batted in

Pitching

Starting pitchers 
Note: G = Games pitched; IP = Innings pitched; W = Wins; L = Losses; ERA = Earned run average; SO = Strikeouts

Other pitchers 
Note: G = Games pitched; IP = Innings pitched; W = Wins; L = Losses; ERA = Earned run average; SO = Strikeouts

Relief pitchers 
Note: G = Games pitched; W = Wins; L = Losses; SV = Saves; ERA = Earned run average; SO = Strikeouts

Farm system 

LEAGUE CHAMPIONS: Orlando

Notes

References 

Player stats from www.baseball-reference.com
Team info from www.baseball-almanac.com

Minnesota Twins seasons
Minnesota Twins season
1981 in sports in Minnesota